Adolf Opel (12 June 1935, in Vienna – 15 July 2018, in Vienna) was an Austrian writer, filmmaker, and editor. He edited publications of the writings of Adolf Loos, Elsie Altmann-Loos, Else Feldmann, and Lina Loos. He also made films about Paul Celan, Elisabeth Bergner, Viktor Frankl, Hans Weigel, Franz Theodor Csokor, and H. C. Artmann. He was the recipient of the Theodor Körner Prize in 1981, 1987, and 1993.

References 

1935 births
2018 deaths
Austrian writers
Austrian filmmakers
Austrian editors
Writers from Vienna